Da'an District may refer to:

Daan District, Taichung, Republic of China (Taiwan)
Daan District, Taipei, Republic of China (Taiwan)
Da'an District, Zigong, Sichuan, People's Republic of China